The sixth season of Charmed, an American supernatural drama television series created by Constance M. Burge, originally aired in the United States on The WB from September 28, 2003 through May 16, 2004. Airing on Sundays at 8:00 pm. Paramount Home Entertainment released the complete sixth season in a six-disc box set on October 17, 2006.

Cast and Characters

Main 
 Alyssa Milano as Phoebe Halliwell
 Rose McGowan as Paige Matthews
 Holly Marie Combs as Piper Halliwell  
 Brian Krause as Leo Wyatt
 Drew Fuller as Chris Halliwell
 Dorian Gregory as Darryl Morris

Recurring 
 James Read as Victor Bennett
 Jennifer Rhodes as Penny Halliwell
 Rebecca Balding as Elise Rothman
 Sandra Prosper as Sheila Morris
 Eric Dane as Jason Dean
 Balthazar Getty as Richard Montana
 Gildart Jackson as Gideon
 Christopher Neiman as Sigmund
 Betsy Randle as Mrs. Winterbourne
 Billy Drago as Barbas, the Demon of Fear
 Jenya Lano as Inspector Sheridan

Guest 
 Wes Ramsey as Wyatt Halliwell
 Marisol Nichols as Bianca
 Rebecca McFarland as Lynn
 Melissa George as Freyja (A Valkyrie)
 Ivana Miličević as Mist (A Valkyrie)
 Evan Marriott as Oscar
 Jennifer Sky as Mabel Stillman
 Jenny McCarthy as Mitzy Stillman
 Melody Perkins as Margo Stillman 
 Rachelle Lefevre as Olivia Callaway
 Michael Muhney as Seth
 Mako as Potion Sorcerer
 Gina Ravera as Mary
 Kathryn Joosten as Old Magician's Wife
 Keith Szarabajka as Zahn
 Jake Busey as Nigel
 Patrick Cassidy as Allen Halliwell
 Eduardo Verástegui as Mr. Right
 Sarah Rafferty as  Carol
 Scott Adsit as Transformed Male Nymph
 Ian Abercrombie as Aramis
 Ken Page as Adair
 Christopher Cazenove as Thrask
James Horan as Crill
 Gabriel Olds as Vincent Right / Vincent Wrong
 Jim Pirri as Corr
 Elaine Hendrix as Clea
 David Ramsey as Upper-Level Demon

Special Musical Guest 
 Smash Mouth
 Steadman
 Ziggy Marley
 Andy Stochansky

Episodes

Notes

References

External links 
 
 

Charmed (TV series) episodes
Charmed (TV series)
2003 American television seasons
2004 American television seasons